Yusuf Baluch (born 2004 in kech,Balochistan) is an indigenous Climate justice and Human Rights activist. He started Activism after experiencing the first hand impacts of the climate crisis in his community.  He is an organizer with School Strike for Climate where he organizes with the regional chapter of Fridays For Future Balochistan. He has been Campaigning against the fossil fuels companies and banks such as standard chartered. He has been vocal against the multi billion project between China and Pakistan CPEC due to it's huge environmental impacts on indigenous communities in Balochistan. He attended COP26 along with other youth activists from MAPA (most affected people and areas) to make sure the most marginalised voices are at the table. He spoke at the overheated event a six day climate event in London presented by Billie Eillish during her Happier Than Ever World Tour.

Personal life 
Yusuf grew up in a small village in southern Balochistan and then later moved to Gwadar for education. He used to live in Gwadar until he moved to London in 2021.

Threats 
Yusuf's family lost their home in a flood when he was a child and they were forced to evacuate in the middle of the night, becoming one of the thousands of untold stories in Balochistan. In 2020, Baluch started Fridays For Future Balochistan and began organising weekly protests. However, after few months of peaceful protests, the Frontier Corps began pressuring the youth activist to stop. Baluch and the other Fridays for Future Activists were interrogated and threatened, forcing them to stop protesting publicly within Balochistan. 

Later when Baluch started protesting weekly alone was reached out by the military again and threatened of abduction if he continues advocating for the climate and human rights. 

Yusuf has been harassed and threatened several times for peacefully protesting and advocating for his rights.

Yusuf currently organised from London where he is able to speak and advocate for Climate Justice and human rights.

References 

 

Youth climate activists
Baloch people
2004 births
Living people
Climate activists
Human rights activists
Pakistani Muslims
Pakistani human rights activists
Environmentalists